John Whitmore may refer to:

John Whitmore (accountant) (c. 1870–1937), American accountant
John Whitmore (architect) (1893–1943), American architect
John Whitmore (banker) (1750–1826), governor of the Bank of England

John Whitmore (racing driver) (born 1937), author, performance coach and former British racing driver
John Whitmore (surfer) (1929–2001), pioneered the sport of surfing in South Africa